The 2009 NORCECA Beach Volleyball Circuit at Manzanillo was held October 2 through October 4, 2009, in Manzanillo, Mexico. It was the sixth leg of the NORCECA Beach Volleyball Circuit 2009. The tournament was dedicated to the memory of Alejandro Salinas de la Garza, the late president of the Mexican National Volleyball Federation.

Women's competition

Men's competition
Results on October 4, 2009

References

External links
 NORCECA
 BV Info

See also
 NORCECA Beach Volleyball Circuit 2009

Manzanillo
Norceca Beach Volleyball Circuit (Manzanillo), 2009